Moodring is the third studio album by American singer Mya, released on June 26, 2003, by A&M and Interscope Records. Before Mya began to work on what would eventually be her third studio album, she participated in prior engagements which would result in the blockbuster success of 2001's "Lady Marmalade", a collaboration for the Moulin Rouge! soundtrack, and a supporting role in the 2002 film Chicago.

Production on Moodring was handled by a bevy of producers and songwriters. Mya enlisted the assistance of producers Ron Fair, Missy Elliott, Timbaland, Rockwilder, Damon Elliott, Jimmy Jam & Terry Lewis, and a handful of others. With this album, Mya wrote "99.9%" of her own lyrics and co-produced many of the album's tracks. While recording the album, Mya funded her own studio time, and used several songs taken from her archive of music, recorded two years prior. Described by Mya as "[s]omewhat of a bi-polar album", Moodring contains elements of R&B, hip hop, techno, pop, and reggae.

The album received generally positive reviews from music critics, with AllMusic praising Mya for coming up with her best and most varied set of songs yet. Moodring debuted at number three on the Billboard 200 with first-week sales of 113,000 copies, marking Mya's highest debut and first-week sales yet. It was certified gold by the Recording Industry Association of America (RIAA), and has sold 589,000 copies in the United States. Moodring spawned two singles, "My Love Is Like...Wo" and "Fallen", with the former reaching the top 40 in several countries. To further promote the album, Mya embarked on the Moodring Tour. In August 2005, after five years with Interscope Records, Mya decided to part ways with the label and her management.

Background
Speaking about the gap between albums, and her transition from one Interscope-distributed imprint University Music to A&M Records, Mya told Billboard magazine, "this has been the biggest gap between projects. Not knowing when my album would come, working with someone like A&M Records president Ron Fair and the transition from moving from an independent label to Interscope sort of left us in limbo."

Development
Although Fear of Flying garnered critical and commercial success, Mya felt unfulfilled and unsatisfied musically and had developed a complex with her last album because it felt more like a concession than her own body of work to her. While speaking with Trace, Mya admitted Fear of Flying was a political war at Interscope Records between her former manager Haqq Islam and CEO Steve Stoute competing with each other. She expressed she was "tired of songs that didn't reveal her vocal capabilities." While acknowledging, that her radio singles were "cool", "nice" and "happy" but didn't really display any of her vocal talent. Mya also bluntly dismissed Fear of Flying as a whole, commenting, "I wouldn't even have bought my last album off of what I presented! In order to buy my last album, I would want more from Mya!"

Frustrated with label politics, she sought to take full control of her next studio effort. Mya named her next project Moodring because she felt there were many facets to this album‚ "ever changing moods, and ever changing colors". With Moodring, Mya's objective was to record an album that she could firmly stand by, and be proud of. Pushed by her newfound freedom, she was instrumental in all creative aspects on the album and credited as a co-writer, co-producer along with Ron Fair as well as served as executive producer. Of her contributions on Moodring, Harrison commented, "I found all my songs this time, with the exception of one or two. I didn't have a puppet master looking over my shoulder, telling me what to, and not do." Harrison further explained, "This time if I didn't write the song, then I produced it. With every song I was hands-on -- the structure of the track, bringing in musicians, and wanting it to sound the way I wanted it to sound."

Convinced that Moodring was her best work to date, she acknowledged she "fronted her own money for studio time, so she could do her own thing. This was the first time in her entire career that she could say that she could breathe." While noting, she took her time with Moodring because she wanted the music to be a representative of Mya.

Recording

In the beginning stages of her third studio album, Mya booked a lot of her own studio time and invested in equipment on her own. While on the road touring, she would record ideas on her tour bus or in her hotel room, singing to tracks from producers that she'd worked with before and people that she would just run into. Commenting on the process, she elaborated: "I began to write and book studio time. That's how I came up with a lot of lyrical and melodic ideas. However, they weren't fully produced." Impressed with the tracks Mya had worked on while on the road, A&M president Ron Fair offered to serve as the album's executive producer. "He'd bring in a lot of musicians or orchestras or bring a hip-hop track to another level", she said of his contributions. Mya reportedly recorded 60 songs for the album; as a result, only the 16 songs were used. Mya had hoped to work with Shaggy and Prodigy from Mobb Deep, however collaborations failed to materialize.

Tentatively titled Smoke & Mirrors, Moodring was initially characterized as a combination of G-funk, reggae and a little bit of pop rock. Prior to entering a recording studio, Mya had 20 songs already written, produced and mastered before she decided to start recording new material for the album. Admittedly, Mya hoped that the album would show her maturity as an artist. "I've grown up and gone through some things, so I'm expressing what I feel", she noted. Unlike her second album Fear of Flying (2000), which addressed somewhat superficial relationship issues, the singer envisioned her new material to be more real and personal, prompting her to pen her own lyrics for this album, according to Damon Elliott, who produced six songs on the disc. Elliott said Mya's lyrical development was not a shock tactic or an effort to keep up with her racy peers – it is more a sign of her own maturation and her interest in being honest and open. Concluding, "Mya can stand on her own", Elliott said. "Her album is gonna be off the chain. It's gonna be off the hook, man."

Music and composition
Previewed by Trace magazine, journalist Omar Dubois wrote, "thematically Moodring was more consistently optimistic than Fear of Flying which he declared was engulfed in adolescent cynicism. Viewed as Mya's most personal album, Moodring was about the person Mya was in 2003 with songs that ranges from emotional to erotic. Moodring opens with the Missy Elliott-produced "My Love Is Like...Wo", a "sexy, no holds-barred" song about a woman in control sexually and emotionally. It is followed by "Fallen", the titillating mid-tempo jeep-banger which cleverly interpolates the Pharcyde's "Runnin'." Next up, the hypnotic, drum and keyboard-driven, Timbaland-laced "Step". The album's fifth track, "Sophisticated Lady", previously known as "Cold Blooded", is a funk-baptized, palpitating bedding. On this record, Trace magazine described Mya as a spunky, seductive, femme-fatale. An ode to Prince and Rick James, Mya explained the concept behind the song, commenting, "I love that pretty s*$%, that pimp s*$%" "That's the s*$% that turns me on when I go to see a stage show. I love Rick like crazy, but Prince is the ultimate of that crazy, feminine, pretty man s*$%! I love it, it's drama! But it's still masculine, because it turns women on! And now, I just flipped it as a female."

The sultry, invitingly delivered "No Sleep Tonight" served as the album's sixth track. Ninth track, the pop soulish Marvin Gaye meets Neneh Cherry choon "Things Come & Go", featured dancehall rapper Sean Paul. A garage-driven number, "Whatever Bitch" was primarily inspired by a gay dance called wagging, and drag queens at the KitKatClub in Berlin. While previewing the album, Trace noted "Whatever Bitch" had all the potential of being a staple on the club scene stateside, and a contender for the prime position on the European club and pop charts. Unbeknownst to the public, an artist had offered Mya and her label a million dollars for the song. Track fifteen, the soothing, acoustic guitar-laden "Take a Picture" was co-written by former collaborator Pink. As with "Whatever Bitch", Trace noted "Take a Picture" had the potential to be a "towering cross-over smash".

Release and promotion

Initially, Mya's third studio album was scheduled for release in November or December 2002 with the album's first single expected to be out in September 2002; however, nothing ever materialized. Speaking with Billboard, Mya appointed the album's delay due to her transitioning within the Universal Music system from an independent label to A&M Records. After much delay, Interscope released Moodring on June 26, 2003, in Japan. A month later, Moodring arrived in stores on July 21, 2003, in the United Kingdom and the following day in the United States. Subsequently, Moodring was released on September 8, 2003 in Germany. As strategic marketing, her label, Interscope coupled Moodring with limited-edition calendars. To kick off promotion for Moodring, Mya appeared and performed "Turn The Beat Around" on The Disco Ball. Taped in 2002, the ABC special aired on January 16, 2003.

In late 2002, The Coca-Cola Company signed Mya to star in their new advertising campaign. Joined by rapper Common, their spot featured the two singing an original song based on the 1960s jazz hook of Eddie Harris' "Compared to What". Interspersed are scenes of each singer casting an amused but skeptical eye on the trappings of celebrity. The 90-second commercial aired during the 30th American Music Awards on January 13, 2003. During a press conference, Dominic Sandifer, senior VP of strategic marketing for Interscope, Geffen, and A&M at Universal Music Group, explained the motion behind the ideal joint project for labels nowadays, noting the Coca-Cola's campaign starring Mya and Common. He commented, "the beverage company licensed the song 'Real Compared to What' for use in its spots, placed Mya and Common in the ad and ran the campaign to coincide with the July release of Mya's album Moodring which featured their version of 'Real Compared to What'. The campaign was worth more than $10 million in promotional TV and radio media for Moodring.

During the album's release week, Mya made guest appearances on Live! With Regis and Kelly, BET's 106 & Park, and NBC's Passions. The following month in August, Mya appeared on WB's Pepsi Smash. On September 13, 2003, Mya performed on the sketch comedy show Mad TV. In October 2003, Mya performed at Lifetime's fourth annual "Women Rock!" benefit concert. She performed her own rendition of Lena Horne's "Stormy Weather". She also performed at the GQ Men of the Year Awards. In November 2003, she was invited to perform at 77th Annual Macy's Thanksgiving Day Parade. Additionally, in November as well, she was featured on MTV's hidden camera-practical joke show Punk'd. In December 2003 Mya made an appearance on the Late Late Show with Craig Kilborn. Filmed in November, Mya performed on the CBS' fifth annual A Home for the Holidays special which aired in December as well.

Singles
Moodring spawned two singles, including lead single "My Love Is Like...Wo", which peaked at number 13 on the Billboard Hot 100 and number 17 on the Hot R&B/Hip-Hop Songs. The single was a commercial success due to its success on mainstream radio and became Mya's fifth solo top-40 single. It was a moderate success internationally, charting within the top 40 in the United Kingdom, Ireland, New Zealand, and Australia. The second and final single, "Fallen", peaked at number 51 on the Billboard Hot 100, while reaching number 35 on the Hot R&B/Hip-Hop Songs chart. "Things Come & Go" featuring Sean Paul was initially planned as a single as well. Interscope had selected "Things Come & Go" as Moodrings second international single and commissioned a music video to be filmed in Miami. Interscope's intentions were to push "Things Come & Go" internationally since Sean Paul had achieved recent success, and was keen to make Mya a success in international territories as well. The plans were later scrapped.

Critical reception

Moodring received generally positive reviews from music critics. At Metacritic, which assigns a weighted mean rating out of 100 to reviews from mainstream critics, the album received an average score of 63, based on 9 reviews, which indicates "generally favorable reviews". AllMusic editor Andy Kellman gave the album 4 out of 5 stars and wrote that "with all the emotional and stylistic range that an album called Moodring should present Mya comes up with her best and most varied set of songs yet." He felt that while "the constant changes of direction can be a little jarring on the first couple plays, they eventually become one of the album's charms." Similarly, Lewis Dene of BBC Music declared the album her "most complete and accessible yet", noting that with Moodring "Mya's set to further remind listeners of her ability to shrewdly bridge the gap between pop/R&B and street-level hip hop."
Sasha Frere-Jones, writing for Slate, called Moodring the "most consistent R&B album of the year."

Tracy E. Hopkins, writing for Rolling Stone, called the album an "ambitious third disc" that "reintroduces the former good girl as a sex kitten – a transformation that began with the Grammy-winning 'Lady Marmalade'." She noted that "whatever her emotion, the eclectic Moodring effectively captures the evolving sensibilities of this rising star." In his review for USA Today, Steve Jones commenced that Mya "has matured nicely since her debut nearly five years ago. She shows no fear of flying off in new, creative directions." Vibe editor Dimitri Ehrlich noted that though Mya "doesn't add any real depth to her artistic sack, she captivates by revealing another stage in her development – as a woman." Entertainment Weekly writer Neil Drumming gave the album a B− rating, commenting that "at best, Moodring exhibits some minor genre dabbling, but truthfully, Mya's source material hasn't broadened much." In speaking of Mya's voice, he said: "Without a commanding voice to override such outdated overtures, Mya's efforts sound strikingly out of touch."

People found that "at times Moodring, with its trip-hop beats and sensual slow jams, is reminiscent of Aaliyah; other times the disc’s pop-R&B sheen brings to mind a younger Janet Jackson. Like both of those singers, Mya has developed a feathery sexiness to go along with the natural sweetness of her soprano, which nevertheless wouldn’t scare the competition on American Idol. Still, this is the stuff that real pop idols are made of." Blenders James Hunter felt that "Mya gets lost on Moodring. The album has no point of view, no way of joining the great Jam-Lewis moments with the crasser stuff. A lover of dance and Broadway who wants to communicate with teens as well as adults, she faces the tall order of making real mink connect with real asphalt, and being Halle Berry with a mic." Terry Sawyer from PopMatters wrote that "for the most part, Moodring sinks like a stone." Declaring the album mixed to her disadvantage, while declaring Mya's voice as "thin", she felt the album "is supposed to be sexy and yearning, but it doesn't rise to the sincerity of a soap opera." She continued by saying "without the vocal acrobatics, the slower numbers serve only to highlight the squeaky fringe of her voice."

Accolades
Moodring was featured on The Village Voices Pazz & Jop end of the year critics list.

Commercial performance
In the United States, Moodring debuted at number three on the Billboard 200 and at number two on Billboards Top R&B/Hip Hop Albums chart, selling 113,000 copies in its first week of release. It marked the highest-selling week of her career up to that point, as well as Mya's highest-peaking album yet on both charts. In its second week, Moodring sold additional 59,700 copies, while dropping to number nine on the Billboard 200. In total, it spent a total of 18 non-consecutive weeks on the chart and was eventually certified gold by the Recording Industry Association of America (RIAA) on September 25, 2003. As of August 2006, it had sold 589,000 copies in the United States.

Internationally, the album was less successful than her previous albums Mya (1998) and Fear of Flying (2000). While Moodring debuted and peaked at number 74 on the Australian Albums Chart, it failed to enter the top 75 of the UK Albums Chart, peaking at number 197. It, however, debuted and peaked at number 25 on the Canadian Albums Chart, becoming Mya's highest-charting album there to date, and peaked at number 53 on the Japan Oricon Albums Chart.

Track listing

Notes
  signifies a co-producer
  signifies an additional producer
  signifies a vocal producer

Sample credits
 "Fallen" contains excerpts and elements from "Saudade Vem Correndo" (1962) as performed by Stan Getz and Luiz Bonfá.
 "Sophisticated Lady" contains replayed elements from "Cold Blooded" (1983) as performed by Rick James.
 "Things Come & Go" contains excerpts from "Aht Uh Mi Hed" (1974) as performed by Shuggie Otis.
 "After the Rain" contains excerpts and elements from "Let Me Make Love to You" (1973) as performed by Lamont Dozier.
 "Take a Picture" contains elements from "(Lay Your Head on My) Pillow" (1994) as performed by Tony! Toni! Toné!

Personnel
Credits adapted from the liner notes of Moodring.

Performers and musicians

 Alex Al – bass guitar
 Romeo Antonio – guitar
 Kyle Armbrust – viola
 Ravi Best – trumpet
 Sandra Billingslea – violin
 Krystyana Chelminski – violin
 Eddie Cole & His Gang – bass, guitar
 Luis Conte – percussion
 James Czeiner – violin, horn
 Earl Flemming – keyboard
 Steve Ferrone – drums
 Eileen Folson – viola, cello
 Clark Gayton – trombone
 G.A. Grant – horn
 Gary Grant – horn
 Darryl Harper – keyboard
 O.J. Harper – keyboard
 Jerry Hey – horn
 Dan Higgins – horn
 Cecelia Hobbs Gardner – violin
 Jun Jensen – cello
 Natalie Leggett – violin, viola
 Jerry Ney – horn
 Joel Peskin – horn
 Bill Reichenbach Jr. – horn
 Kris Ricat – guitar, horn
 Maxine Roach – viola
 Derek Scott – guitar
 Carl "Butch" Small – percussion
 Michael Valerio – bass

Technical

 Mike Anzel – engineer 
 Marc Baptiste – photography
 Patrice Bowie – vocal assistance
 Bruce Buechner – engineer 
 Randy Bugnitz – engineer 
 Sue Ann Carwell – vocal assistance
 Ian Cross – engineer 
 Eric Dawkins – vocal assistance
 Jimmy Douglass – engineer 
 Dylan Dresdow – engineer 
 Laurie Evans – vocal assistance
 Ron Fair – vocal production
 Drew FitzGerald – art direction
 David Guerrero – engineer 
 Mark Harrison – vocal production
 Tal Herzberg – engineer 
 Troy Hightower – engineer
 Pete Karam – engineer 
 Matt Marrin – engineering assistance
 Sheryl Nields – photography
 Dave Pensado – mixing engineer 
 Eddy Schreyer – mastering engineer 
 Brian Summerville – engineer 
 Brian "B Luv" Thomas – engineer 
 Ryan West – engineer 
 Katrina Willis – vocal assistance
 Ethan Willoughby – mixing assistance
 Doug Wilson – engineer 
 Frank Wolf – engineer

Charts

Weekly charts

Year-end charts

Certifications and sales

Release history

Notes

References

2003 albums
A&M Records albums
Albums produced by DJ Clue?
Albums produced by James Poyser
Albums produced by Jimmy Jam and Terry Lewis
Albums produced by Missy Elliott
Albums produced by Questlove
Albums produced by Rockwilder
Albums produced by Ron Fair
Albums produced by Timbaland
Albums produced by Tricky Stewart
Interscope Records albums
Mýa albums